Epidendrum pseudodifforme  Hoehne & Schltr., 1925 is an epiphytic orchid, occurring in Brazil.

It should not be confused with Epidendrum pseudodifforme  Hoehne & Schltr., 1926 nom. illeg., which is a synonym for Epidendrum umbelliferum J.F.Gmel. 1791

References 

pseudodifforme
Epiphytic orchids
Orchids of Brazil